Team Ferlito is a team formed in 1984 at Verona. It is also known under the name  Ferlito Motors '  used until 2010 on racing cars and is still the name of the team.

The team has participated in numerous editions of touring cars and sportscar at Italian and European level, and by 2005 is a regular with its Jaguar, in the Superstars Series; category in which they won the Italian title in 2006.

Beginning 

In 1984 Team Ferlito started racing competition in some races of the f. 2000 Championship with a Ralt  RT-1  Toyota. The experience is positive, so much so that their commitment is re-engaged for the next two seasons, in which they deploy a more competitive Dallara  384 , which allows them to conquer the third place overall in the 1985 season.

In parallel with the participation in the  f. 2000, in 1987 and 1988 the team also participates in the sportscar Championship, winning for best result with a victory in 2 hours of  Misano.

Italian Superturismo Championship 

In 1989 the team participated for the first time at the Italian Superturismo Championship, a championship that will see them appear for more than a decade and will get them results.

Racing in the CIVT is done with an Alfa Romeo 75, with which, after numerous placings, in 1991 Team Ferlito is rewarded best private team Alfa Romeo, winning the title of champion in the  N3 class   with Vincent Faraji and placing fourth with an Alfa Romeo 164 entrusted directly by the parent company, with the driver the President of Commissione Sportiva Automobilistica Italiana Fabrizio Serena di Lapigio.

In the same year, former pilot of Formula 1 Arturo Merzario races with Team Ferlito, getting a second place in the  6 hours of Vallelunga.

In these years the team is also active in Spanish touring car with a Championship win in their Alfa Romeo 75 led by Luis Villamil and former pilot of Formula 1 Luis Perez-Sala in 1989 and in 1991.

In 1993 the competitive and reliable Alfa Romeo 75 are flanked by an Alfa Romeo 164  V6 Turbo  entrusted to the Verona team directly from casa del biscione for participating in the CIVT and three Alfa Romeo SZ to compete in the Championship dedicated to them, where they posed a second and third place overall.

The collaboration with the Alfa Romeo continues with the arrival in 1995 of the new Alfa Romeo 155  2000 16v , which at the wheel Sandro won the second place overall in 1995 and winning the Championship in 1996.

Over the next few years the team would bring different drivers aboard the Alfa Romeo Team Ferlito with Giuliano Alessi, Fabio Piscopo, Marco Baroncini, Cora De Adamich and Francesco Iorio, who in 2001 won the Challenge Alfa Romeo in an Alfa Romeo 156  TS 16v N3 group. 

In 2002 and 2003 in addition to CIVT, the team also participates in  Over-production Championship  with two Alfa Romeo 147  SP , with some good placings.

Superstars Series 

Midway through the 2005 season Jaguar gives the Team two handling  Jaguar S-Type R  participating in the Championship Superstars Series, a category reserved for V8-powered sedans are derived.

Despite the short time available for the preparation of the cars, the results are slow in coming and already in debut season coming in second place in Varano and a third at Mugello.

2006 is the year of results in the Italian Superstars Championship. After not even a year after the beginning of the collaboration with Jaguar, Max Pigoli and his  S-Type R  won the Italian title in Verona.

In 2007 the team comes up with defending champion Max Pigoli flanked by Alessandro Balzan Foundation; the duo manages to get a brace in the opening round of the Championship and fight all season for the title, but it eludes both in Italian and international series.

2008 and 2009 are years of transition, the team continues its commitment in the Championship with two Jaguar  S-Type R  entrusted one by Ermanno Dionysius and the other at different riders with race by race, including the actor Walter Nudo; at the same time began the development of the new Jaguar XFR, which is to debut at the last race of the 2009 season at Kyalami.

In 2010 the  XFR  at the start are two cars, at the wheel initially Matteo Cressoni and Marcello Puglisi, but the team see different drivers during the season with more drivers, which slows the development of the team and more satisfactory results in the following season.

The 2011 sees Jaguar leave the Team the usual green livery that has always characterized in Superstars Series to take the new sponsor, the energy drink  Gasoline For Humans.  The two  XFR  entrusted for the entire season with the debutante Luigi Cecchi and Francesco Sini results in a second place, with the latter, in the inaugural race at the circuit of Monza and manage to get several placings in the points during the championship; This allows them to finish in sixth place in the team standings.

References

External links 

 Official Site
 Superstars Series

Italian auto racing teams
Auto racing teams established in 1984